The UConn Huskies women's ice hockey program represented the University of Connecticut Huskies during the 2020–21 NCAA Division I women's ice hockey season.

Offseason

Recruiting

Regular season

Standings

Schedule
Source:

|-
!colspan=12 style=""| Regular Season
|-

Roster

2020-21 Huskies

Awards and honors
Tia Chan, Hockey East Pro Ambitions All-Rookie Team
 Jada Habisch, Hockey East Pro Ambitions All-Rookie Team

References

Connecticut
UConn Huskies women's ice hockey seasons
Conn
Connect
Connect